The Yandall Sisters were a popular New Zealand-born Samoan all-female singing group of the 1970s, who made a major contribution to music in New Zealand. The members of the group were Caroline, Mary and Adele Yandall, and later younger sister Pauline Yandall.

In 1974, their hit song "Sweet Inspiration" stayed on the NZ Top 20 singles chart for eight weeks, and has become a classic favourite in New Zealand and the Pacific Islands. The track was a cover of the song by an American group of the same name.

In 1977, the Yandall Sisters were named New Zealand Group of the Year. Popular entertainers in their own right, they have provided backing vocals for hundreds of musicians and entertainers, in New Zealand and Australia. These include notable showbands and Maori artists including the late Prince Tui Teka, the late Sir Howard Morrison, the late Bunny Walters and John Rowles.

Mary Yandall recorded an album with Rodger Fox in 1987. She died aged 62 on 30 January 2012 at Auckland Hospital after a short illness.

In 2007, the Yandall Sisters were awarded the "Lifetime Achievement" award by the Pacific Music Awards Trust in Aotearoa in recognition of their significant contribution to Pacific Music.

Discography

Singles

 (1975) "Sweet Inspiration" #8
 (1984) "Hei Konei Rā" #21 (Pātea Māori Club featuring Dalvanius and the Yandall Sisters)

Session work
 Will Crummer - Shoebox Love Songs - Ode CDMANU5113 - 2011
 Space Waltz - Space Waltz - EMI HSD 1038 - 1975, (Also released on World Record Club E 3207)
 Bunny Walters - "Take The Money And Run"
 Deane Waretini - Waretini - CBS SBP 237634 - 1981

See also
Samoan New Zealander

References

New Zealand pop music groups
New Zealand girl groups
New Zealand people of Samoan descent
Samoan singers